is a flatland-style Japanese castle located in the city of Shibata, Niigata Prefecture, Japan. Throughout the Edo period, Shibata Castle was home to the Mizoguchi clan, daimyō of Shibata Domain.

Background
Shibata Castle is located at the center of the modern city of Shibata, approximately 20 kilometers east of the city of Niigata. Historically, the area was a vast marsh made by Shinano River and the Agano River, which were both important trade routes for Echigo Province. The construction date of the original Shibata Castle is unknown; however, the surrounding area was under control of the Shibata clan since the Kamakura period. The Shibata were a cadet branch of the Sasaki clan, from Sasaki Moritsuna, a retainer of Minamoto no Yoritomo who had been awarded estates in this area for his role in suppressing a local rebellion. By the middle of Muromachi period, the Shibata were the most powerful of the "Agekitashu", a group of local petty lords who were mostly independent due to their distance from the provincial capital at Jōetsu. However, by the Sengoku period, the Shibata became retainers of Uesugi Kenshin, and Shibata Nagatsu (1538-1580) was ranked among Kenshin's top seven generals. After Kenshin's death, his two adopted sons Uesugi Kagekatsu and Uesugi Kagetora fought a war over the succession. The Shibata were instrumental in Kagekatsu's victory but were highly incensed when Kagekatsu failed to follow through on his promises to increase their territory. Lured by promised by Oda Nobunaga, Shibata Shigeie (1547-1587) revolted against Kagekatsu, but was defeated after a fierce seven year war,  and the clan was destroyed.

Shibata Castle was taken by Uesugi Kagekatsu, but in 1597, Toyotomi Hideyoshi moved the Uesugi clan to Aizu-Wakamatsu and assigned the former Shibata lands to Mizoguchi Hidekatsu in 1598. Hidekatsu had originally been a retainer of Niwa Nagahide, but after his death pledged fealty directly to Toyotomi Hideyoshi. After the death of Toyotomi Hideyoshi, he pledged fealty to Tokugawa Ieyasu, and was confirmed in his holdings by the new Tokugawa shogunate after the Battle of Sekigahara,

The Mizoguchi clan rebuilt Shibata Castle in the contemporary flatland castle style. The geographic location is secured place surrounded by rivers, on two sides and the surrounding marshland. As the Mizoguchi clan had only limited resources, the construction processed very slowly, and was not completed until the rule of the 3rd generation daimyō of Shibata Domain, Mizobuchi Nobunao, in 1654. Much of the castle was destroyed by a fire in 1668 and rebuilt by 1679. The current  main gate dates from a 1732 reconstruction and is the oldest surviving structure of the castle.

Layout
The inner bailey of the castle is a pentagonal area approximately 100 meters in length, surrounded by tall wall and roughly follows the outlines of the original Shibata clan fortification. Yagura turrets were built at each corner of inner bailey, with the yagura on the west corner larger than the others, and served in lieu of a tenshu. This three-story yagura has an unusual T-shaped roof, with a distinctive three three gables and hence, thus three statues of shachihoko on the roof. A secondary bailey surrounded the inner bailey, protected by clay walls, except for the walls on the south and west (which faced the jōkamachi, which were in stone. The secondary bailey had gates to the east, west and south, with the south gate being the main gate to the castle. A third bailey was located to the south of the second bailey. The total size of castle was about 500 meters long by 200 meters wide.

Current situation
Following the Meiji restoration and subsequent abolition of the han system, the Mizobuchi clan surrendered Shibata Castle to the new Meiji government. In 1871, the castle was garrisoned by a detachment of the Imperial Japanese Army, and in 1873 most of the structures were pulled down. At the time, it had 11 yagura and five gates. Of those 16 main structures only one gate, the  Omotemon,  and one yagura   remain today. Both are designated as important cultural properties. The wall outside the turret, in a style called , is waterproof. The stone wall is made of regularly piled stones in the manner of Kirikomihagi.

In 2006, Shibata Castle was listed as one of the 100 Fine Castles of Japan by the Japan Castle Foundation.

The majority of the secondary and the inner baileys are occupied by a Japan Ground Self Defense Force base and public access is not permitted.

Gallery

See also
 List of foreign-style castles in Japan

Bibliography

External links 

Guide to Japanese Castles site
Japanese Castle Explorer - Shibata Castle

Castles in Niigata Prefecture
100 Fine Castles of Japan
Echigo Province
History of Niigata Prefecture
Shibata, Niigata
Mizoguchi clan